Meghan Andrews is an American actress and singer from New York City. She has been a studio singer and actress ever since the age of nine.

Andrews is most notable for playing the role of Mallory Pike from The Baby-Sitters Club television series. She is an alternative folk/pop guitarist and singer-songwriter. She starred in the off-Broadway show The Trip to Bountiful and released her debut album Center of Gravity. Andrews is a member of the Actors Studio.

Filmography

Track listing of Center of Gravity 

"Center of Gravity"
"The Garden of Hardly Here"
"Trial & Error"
"Annie"
"Human Love"
"Carry Me"
"Tiny Belgian Town"
"Oasis"

References

External links

Meghan Andrews at MySpace
Meghan Andrews at CD Baby

1979 births
20th-century American actresses
American soap opera actresses
21st-century American women singers
21st-century American singers
Actresses from New York City
American women singer-songwriters
Living people
American television actresses
American folk singers
American child actresses
21st-century American women guitarists
21st-century American guitarists